Jenni Honkanen-Mikkonen (born 24 February 1980 in Lahti) is a Finnish sprint canoeist who has competed since the mid-2000s. She won a bronze medal in the K-2 200 m event at the 2006 ICF Canoe Sprint World Championships in Szeged.

Honkanen-Mikkonen also competed in three Summer Olympics, earning her best finish of seventh in the K-2 500 m event at Beijing in 2008.

Her husband, Kalle, also competes as a sprint canoer for Finland.

References
 
 
 

1980 births
Living people
Sportspeople from Lahti
Canoeists at the 2004 Summer Olympics
Canoeists at the 2008 Summer Olympics
Canoeists at the 2012 Summer Olympics
Finnish female canoeists
Olympic canoeists of Finland
ICF Canoe Sprint World Championships medalists in kayak